Edmund Gilligan (1898–1973) was an American author.

Born on June 7, 1898 in Waltham, Massachusetts, he was educated at Harvard University, and served in the United States Navy during the First World War. He
died on December 29, 1973 (age 75) in Woodstock, New York, USA.

Among his novels was The Gaunt Woman, filmed under the title Sealed Cargo in 1951.

Bibliography

 One Lives to Tell the Tale (1931)
 Boundary Against Night (1938)
 White Sails Crowding (1939)
 Strangers in The Vly (1941)
 The Ringed Horizon (1943)
 The Gaunt Woman (1943)
 The Voyage of the Golden Hind (1945)
 I Name Thee Mara (1946)
 Storm at Sable Island (1948)
 Sea Dog (1954)
 Shoe the Wild Mare (1956)
 My Earth, My Sea (1959)

Harvard University alumni
People from Waltham, Massachusetts
1898 births
1973 deaths
20th-century American male writers